Goodenia stephensonii is a species of flowering plant in the family Goodeniaceae and is endemic to eastern New South Wales. It is an erect, more or less woody herb with linear to oblong stem leaves and racemes of yellow flowers with a pouched corolla.

Description
Flowering occurs from October to January.

Taxonomy and naming
Goodenia stephensonii was first formally described in 1887 by Ferdinand von Mueller in The Victorian Naturalist from specimens collected by "L. Stephenson".

Distribution
This goodenia grows in forest and woodland between Gosford and the upper Hunter Valley.

References

stephensonii
Flora of New South Wales
Plants described in 1887
Taxa named by Ferdinand von Mueller